The Moray Eels Eat the Holy Modal Rounders is the fourth studio album by the New York psychedelic folk band the Holy Modal Rounders, released in 1968 through Elektra Records. The record's title is in reference to The Moray Eels, a rock band that member Peter Stampfel was attempting to start after splitting up with Steve Weber. Peter Stampfel does not regard the album in the highest esteem, noting it reflected producer Frazier Mohawk's musical taste more so than the Holy Modal Rounders.

Track listing

Recording

During the recording sessions for the album, the band struggled to get member Steve Weber to practice, Peter Stampfel remembers "You want a record to sound good, ya gotta stand there with a gun pointed at his crotch, cock the trigger, and say practice, motherfucker!". 

Additionally, the band were on many different drugs from session to session which caused a few difficulties when recording, Stampfel recalled that "it was "no problem on the first two Prestige albums, on which Weber and I were ripped on speed and pot." Stampfel harks back to one session where he abstained from taking amphetamines; however, producer Frazier Mohawk decided to bring in some heroin for himself as well as "Weber, Tyler and Levy", this caused Mohawk to "freak out and shut himself in a closet" resulting in a failed recording session. Stampfel added "Naturally, he blamed the session's failure on us to David Anderle, the man in charge under Holzman. When I explained what happened to David, he said my version made more sense than Mohawk's had."

"The STP Song" was left unfinished as Frazier Mohawk insisted the song was sufficiently done as to require no more lyrics when the band had only done two verses.

Production

In reference to the structure of the record as flowing as two continuous suites, Peter Stampfel remarked "both of the engineers decided it would be a cool thing to make the records without any grooves between the songs, 'cause it would be more psychedelic or something. Also, I stupidly didn't go to the mixing session. I didn't realize, at the time, going to mixing sessions was key when you're making an album. I'm a very slow learner, and often have to do things the wrong way many times before I get the hint. But even after there were grooves, it wouldn't have altered the really sloppy material that was involved. So I can't really fault anybody, except for us, as far as the quality of those records was."

Peter Stampfel did not like the record being structured this way, because it meant it'd be impossible to have one song off of the album for radio airplay, the rest of the band disliked the decision too.

When it came to taking band photographs Peter Stampfel recalls "Now what happened here was we had finally finished the recording, and were having a speed crash. We had been up for a number of days, we were about as exhausted as we could be," counters Stampfel. "We assumed nothing was going to happen at this point as far as pictures went, because Sam and his girlfriend went to Death Valley after the session, and, of course, in order to photograph a band, the whole band needs to be there. So we had just fallen asleep and clueless Mohawk, fully aware that Sam is gone and that we are beyond wiped out, shows up with some photo people. Being at the time less assertive than I now am, I neglected to do the proper thing, which would have been to kick his idiot ass around the block a few times. Instead, I tried to get Antonia up. Although I got her out of bed, she was still asleep. When I sat her down on a chair, she unconsciously thought it was the toilet and peed."

Reception

Ritchie Unterberger regarded "Half a Mind" as rivaling "some of Syd Barrett's solo work" as well as describing the album as "a triumph, a melange of mind-melting acid folk that might have hung together by a thread, but was usually exhilarating, with a cracked, brain-damaged mystique all its own."

Popular Culture

"Bird Song" was featured in the 1969 film Easy Rider directed by Dennis Hopper, the song caught the attention of Peter Fonda who heard it on the radio and thought it would be a perfect fit for the movie. The melody is lifted from Ray Price's "You Done Me Wrong" from 1956.

Personnel

The Holy Modal Rounders
Sam Shepard – percussion
Peter Stampfel – banjo, electric violin, vocals
Richard Tyler – piano
Steve Weber – guitar, vocals

Additional musicians and production
William S. Harvey – art direction
Bob Labla – engineering
Robin Labla – engineering
Frazier Mohawk – production
John Wesley Annis – bass guitar & drums

Release history 

This release includes extensive liner notes, including interviews and photographs

References

External links

1968 albums
Elektra Records albums
The Holy Modal Rounders albums